Yashma Gill (، born 20 November 1989) is a Pakistani film and television actress. After starring in supporting role in a number of projects, Gill played the lead roles in the acclaimed projects, Ki Jaana Main Kaun (2018) and Kab Mere Kehlaoge (2018), and received praise for playing an antagonist in the romantic series Pyar Ke Sadqay (2020). In 2019, Gill has launched her own video YouTube channel.

Personal life 
Gill is from Jahanian, Khanewal in Punjab, Pakistan. She was an atheist till teenage but while studying in Australia, she converted to Islam.
In an interview with Samina Peerzada, she reveled her spiritual journey and how she reverted to Islam after a phase of being an atheist. Gill studied psychology at the La Trobe University in Australia, and then returned to her home country.

Filmography

Film

Telefilm

Short film

Television

Anthology series

References

External links

Living people
Actresses from Karachi
21st-century Pakistani actresses
Pakistani Sunni Muslims
Pakistani Muslims
Converts to Islam from atheism or agnosticism
Pakistani YouTubers
Pakistani expatriates in Australia
Punjabi people
1989 births